The  Democratic Republic of the Congo national rugby union team (French: Équipe de République Démocratique du Congo de rugby à XV) represents DR Congo in men's international competitions, it is a member of the International Rugby Board (IRB), and have yet to play in a Rugby World Cup tournament. 

They were due to appear in the 2008 Castel Beer Trophy, but they were replaced by Belgian club side Kibubu after they pulled out for financial reasons.

Record

Overall

See also
 Rugby union in the Democratic Republic of the Congo

References

African national rugby union teams 
Rugby union in the Democratic Republic of the Congo
Rugby